Thornburg House is a historic home located at Barboursville, Cabell County, West Virginia. It was built in 1901, and is a two-story brick and frame dwelling with irregular massing, varied roof shapes, and large porches in the Queen Anne style.  It features a corner turret with a pointed roof and a wraparound porch.  Also on the property is a contributing privy.

It was listed on the National Register of Historic Places in 1991.

References

Houses on the National Register of Historic Places in West Virginia
Queen Anne architecture in West Virginia
Colonial Revival architecture in West Virginia
Houses completed in 1901
Houses in Cabell County, West Virginia
National Register of Historic Places in Cabell County, West Virginia